Ray Staff is a British mastering engineer, best known for his work with a diverse mix of artists including Led Zeppelin, The Rolling Stones, The Clash and Black Sabbath.  Most recently he has mastered albums for Muse.

Biography and career
Joining Trident Studios (a recording facility originally located at 17, St. Anne's Court in London's Soho district) in 1970, Ray Staff became part of the newly formed Mastering Department contributing to projects such as: David Bowie, Aladdin Sane, Ziggy Stardust and Elton John.  Staff moved on to become Trident's first Chief Mastering Engineer.

For Monty Python,  Staff created the world's first three-sided album by cutting two spirals on one side of the disc, creating the "hidden" third side.  This was topped later with a Johnny Moped album for Ace Records, where the first track on the A-side was double cut, the two spirals then joined to play the remaining side of the album.

Whilst Senior Mastering Engineer at Sony's UK Studios, Staff became part of the international team developing Sony's proprietary archiving system.

Other classics mastered by Staff include Physical Graffiti and Presence by Led Zeppelin, Crime of the Century by Supertramp, It's Only Rock 'n Roll by The Rolling Stones and Hemispheres by Rush.

Recent years
He is regularly featured in Hi-Fi publications for his work on audiophile vinyl releases. He is also much sought after by labels Alchemy Soho from the worlds of jazz, world music, classical and crossover.  Staff is also building an increasing number of surround mastering projects to his portfolio, including Gary Moore, Deep Purple, Nick Cave and the Bad Seeds and Alice Cooper released during the past few months.

Discography

References

Further reading

External links

Ray Staff at airstudiosmastering.com
Ray Staff on Recordproduction.com

British record producers
Living people
Year of birth missing (living people)
Mastering engineers